Totális Metal is the debut album by Hungarian heavy metal band Pokolgép. The band was one of the first metal bands in Hungary and the first to release a metal album and single (1985, A Sátán/A maszk). Totális Metal has very strong Judas Priest and Accept influences. This album became legendary in Hungary.

The album was released originally on vinyl and cassette, but in 2003, Hungaroton re-released on CD with bonuses.

Track listing
All music written by Pokolgép. All lyrics written by Feró Nagy.

Side A
 A jel (3:26)
 Pokolgép (3:06)
 Démon (4:09)
 A tűz (2:54)
 B.S. emlékére (In memorial of Bon Scott) (4:04)
Side B
 Totális metal (3:35)
 Mennyit érsz? (3:47)
 Átkozott nemzedék (3:52)
 Mindhalálig rock and roll (3:20)
 ...tovább (3:36)
CD bonus tracks
 Kegyetlen asszony (4:40)
 Gép-induló (Live 1990) (4:45)

Personnel
 József Kalapács - vocals
 Gábor Kukovecz - guitars
 László Nagyfi - guitars
 György Pazdera - bass
 László Tarcza - drums
 Feró Nagy - match (on track 4)

External links
 Pokolgép official website

1986 debut albums
Pokolgép albums